Shaun Todd McBride (born July 7, 1987), better known by his online alias Shonduras, is an American entrepreneur and social media personality from Clearfield, Utah. He is best known on Snapchat for his finger-drawings, filming his life on YouTube, as well as being the owner and founder of his own esports organization, Spacestation Gaming. Shaun McBride owns ten companies within the Spacestation: Shonduras, A For Adley, Spacestation Animation, Quarter Machine, Moonwalk Media, Remarketing Space, Spacestation Investments, Spacestation Integrations, Spacestation CPG, Spacestation Gaming. He's also a skateboarder and snowboarder.

Discovery 
In 2014, Shonduras had made a Snapchat account to share his adventures with his family. He started drawing on Snapchat, and sent his drawings to only his friends and family. He started getting popular after he had doodled an elderly woman into a My Little Pony character with rainbow hair. He had sent it to his sisters, and they showed it to their friends at school. They started adding him to see more of his Snapchat art which is where his audience first started to grow. Shonduras' audience became so big that by advertising through Snapchat, it had become his job. Shonduras was one of Snapchat's first content creators to gain a following. In 2015, he bought a Canon 70D DSLR to start vlogging his life and is still doing it to this day with the same camera. The Shonduras YouTube channel has over three million subscribers.

Snapchat 
Shonduras created content on Snapchat. He did share the adventures he had on Snapchat to not only his friends and family, but his fans as well. His stories have included him walking a tiger and riding an elephant in Thailand. He flew in a helicopter over glaciers in Alaska, started multiple virtual thumb wars with one of the Jonas Brothers, Kevin Jonas. Shonduras also shared experiences at Disneyland and Disney World and was invited backstage at the Austin City Limits Music Festival. However, the stories he created and shared were entertaining and would show him gaming with friends, skateboarding with friends, going to the dentist, or waiting 7 hours at an airport for his flight to leave. No matter what he was up to, he turned it into a Snapchat story. He created a series called,  "Make My Monday" where he completed dares that were sent to him by his fans every Monday. Shonduras participated in "SnapperHero", SnapperHero was Snapchat's first original series. He uploaded some of his Snapchat story compilations to his YouTube channel.

YouTube 
Shonduras started his vlogging career on August 5, 2015 which is also his first daughter's birthday, he started vlogging his week and would post every Sunday. He would shortly transfer to daily vlogs that are called "Best Day Ever" to be uploaded starting in November 2015. In the Best Day Ever's, Shonduras shows his life from traveling, family time, as well as what he does at his office called "Spacestation". On March 4, 2017, he hit one million subscribers on his YouTube channel.

Nominations and Awards 
In the 5th annual Streamy Awards, Shonduras was nominated for both "Best Short Form Creativity" and "Best Snapchat Storyteller." SnapperHero, which he participated in, won the Streamy Award for "Best Short Form Creativity." In both the 5th and 6th annual Streamy Awards, he won the "Snapchat Storyteller" Streamy award. In the 7th annual Shorty Awards, Shonduras was a finalist in "The Best Snapchatter" category. In 2016, he was nominated in The Ghosties for both "Snapchatter of the Year" and "Best Storyteller", he won the "Snapchatter of the Year" Ghostie award.

Collaborators 
 Casey Neistat, an American YouTube personality, has been a frequent collaborator with Shonduras.
Kevin Jonas, an American singer-songwriter and actor, has been a collaborator with Shonduras.
Gary Vaynerchuk, a Belarusian-American entrepreneur and internet personality, has been a frequent collaborator with Shonduras.
Tanner Fox, an American social media influencer, is a frequent collaborator with Shonduras
Peter McKinnon, a Canadian filmmaker and social media influencer, is a frequent collaborator with Shonduras.
Derral Eves, an American entrepreneur and YouTube personality, has been a frequent collaborator with Shonduras.
Dan and Lincoln Markham also known as What's Inside, an American YouTube personality, has been a collaborator with Shonduras.

References

External links 
 Official Website
Official Spacestation Website
 Shonduras on Snapchat
Shonduras on YouTube

American artists
Vine (service) celebrities
Living people
1989 births
People from Clearfield, Utah